Doyle, California may refer to:
 Doyle, Lassen County, California
 Doyle, Tulare County, California, Tulare County, California